Marius Mason (born Marie Mason, January 26, 1962) is an American anarchist who in 2009 was sentenced to 22 years in prison after admitting 13 counts of arson and property damage amounting to US$4 million. Mason, a member of the Earth Liberation Front, was prosecuted for a 1999 attack on a building at Michigan State University, East Lansing, Michigan, that caused more than US$1 million in damage, undertaken as a protest against research into genetically modified crops. A further US$3 million in damage included attacks on homes under construction, and on boats owned by a mink farmer.  

Supporters claim that this case represents a form of political persecution, as part of the Green Scare phenomenon, when an overlong sentence is given to an individual who committed crimes against property.

Around July 2014, Marius came out as a transgender man.

Background
Mason has worked as a gardener, musician, writer, Earth First! organizer, and a volunteer for a free herbal-healthcare collective. He is a parent of two children. Mason and his husband at the time, Frank Ambrose, ignited an office that held records related to research on genetically modified, moth-resistant potatoes, funded by the United States Agency for International Development and biotech company Monsanto ($2,500 out of the $20 million funding). The next day, Mason and Ambrose set fire to commercial logging equipment in Mesick, Michigan. Both arsons were claimed by the Earth Liberation Front as actions against genetic engineering, deforestation, and other environmentally destructive acts. On December 31, 1999, members of the Land Liberation Front claimed an arson attack on the Michigan State University farm building located in East Lansing, Michigan, US ELF claimed it set the fire specifically to stop the work of those studying genetically modified foods.

In 2007, after evidence linking him to the attacks was found, Ambrose began co-operating with police. Over the following year, he recorded 178 conversations with Mason and other activists. Mason and three others were indicted in March 2008. Ambrose divorced Mason on the day the latter was arrested. In February 2009, Mason was sentenced to 22 years in prison for arson, then the record sentence for an American eco-terrorist act. In return for his co-operation with prosecutors, Ambrose was sentenced to less than six years for conspiracy to commit arson, despite court documents connecting him to attacks causing damage costing over $4 million.

Trial

According to Assistant U.S. Attorney Hagen Frank, the 20-year sentence sought by the prosecution would be "the most onerous sentence imposed in a case of this sort".

At the trial, the prosecution argued that "A good cause does not justify the worst means. That's not how society works."

During the three-hour hearing, Mason said, "I am genuinely sorry to those who were personally frightened by my actions.... I meant to inspire thought and compassion, not fear." After the sentence, defense lawyer John Minock stated that he would appeal, commenting, "I'm shocked. It's grossly out of proportion to other cases."

Personal life 

Mason transitioned in 2016 while in federal prison, and was reported as the first trans man to do so. He came out to friends and family two years prior.

See also
Green Anarchism
Genetically modified food
Rod Coronado
Jeff Luers
Eric McDavid

References

External links
 
 Support Marius Mason
Reed, Henry. Between Orwell and McCarthy: the crucifixion of Marie Mason, from the Fifth Estate, Spring 2009
Goldenberg, Suzanne. Serving 22 years: the environmentalist who fell victim to US anti-terror laws, The Guardian, March 24, 2009.
 Gitmo in the Heartland
 Environmentalist Sentenced to 21 Years as a Terrorist

1962 births
Living people
American people convicted of arson
American environmentalists
Eco-terrorism
Place of birth missing (living people)
Earth Liberation Front
Industrial Workers of the World members
Transgender men